A quorum is the minimum number of members of a deliberative body necessary to conduct the business of that group.

Quorum may also refer to:

Minyan, in Judaism, a quorum required for certain religious obligations
The Quorum, New Orleans coffee house famous for being a seat of racial integration during the 60s
Quorum (distributed computing), the minimum number of votes required to be allowed to perform an operation
The Quorum (magazine), the first British homosexual magazine, shortlived in 1920
Quorum (horse), sire of Red Rum
Quorum (Latter Day Saints), a body of priesthood holders in the Latter Day Saint movement
Quorum Business Park, an office development in North Tyneside, North East England, United Kingdom
Quorum sensing, a system of stimulus and response correlated to population density
Quorum, a London fashion boutique founded in the 1960s by Alice Pollock
Quorum, a government agency in the DC Comics Universe

See also
QUOROM flow chart, a flow chart of studies in a systematic review